Marissa Maurin Gausset (born 10 December 1966) is a Chilean sailor. She competed in the Europe event at the 1992 Summer Olympics.

References

1966 births
Living people
Place of birth missing (living people)
Chilean female sailors (sport)
Olympic sailors of Chile
Sailors at the 1992 Summer Olympics – Europe